Archaeological Museum of Epidaurus is a museum in Epidaurus, in Argolis on the Peloponnese peninsula, Greece. The museum, noted for its reconstructions of temples and its columns and inscriptions, was established in 1902 and opened in 1909 to display artifacts unearthed in the ancient site of Epidaurus in the surrounding area.

References

External links

Hellenic Ministry of Foreign Affairs
www.greece-museums.com
Images of items found at Epidauras

Epidaurus
Buildings and structures in Argolis
Museums established in 1902